Poet Lore is an English-language literary magazine based in Bethesda, Maryland. Established in 1889 by Charlotte Porter and Helen Archibald Clarke, two progressive young Shakespeare scholars who believed in the evolutionary nature of literature, Poet Lore is the oldest continuously published poetry journal in the United States.  Porter and Clarke, who were life partners as well as co-editors, launched the magazine as a forum on "Shakespeare, Browning, and the Comparative Study of Literature" but soon sought out the original work of living writers—featuring more drama than poetry at first, and moving beyond North America and Europe to publish in translation the work of writers from Asia, South America, and the Middle East. In its early decades, the magazine featured poetry by Rabindranath Tagore, Frederic Mistral, Rainier Maria Rilke, Stephane Mallarmé, and Paul Verlaine. The first translation of Chekhov's The Seagull appeared in its pages.

The Writer's Center, a literary non-profit based near Washington, DC, currently publishes Poet Lore in semi-annual installments, featuring poetry by established writers side by side with those just breaking into print. Poet Lore also publishes essays of interest to poets and readers, as well as reviews of new books of poetry.

Contributors
In its first few decades, Poet Lore published the works of such renowned writers as Rabindranath Tagore, Rainer Maria Rilke, Paul Verlaine, Frederick Mistral, Stephane Mallarmé, Anton Chekhov, Maxim Gorky, Jose Echegaray, Hermann Hesse, Henrik Ibsen, August Strindberg, Emma Lazarus, and Sara Teasdale. Award-winning American poets whose early work (in some cases their first published poems) appeared in the pages of Poet Lore include Mary Oliver, Linda Pastan, Colette Inez, R. T. Smith, D. Nurkse, John Balaban, Carolyn Forché, Alice Fulton, Dana Gioia, Pablo Medina, Seán Mac Falls, Kim Addonizio, David Baker, Carl Phillips, Natasha Trethewey, Terrance Hayes, Dede Wilson, and Reginald Dwayne Betts.

Bibliography

References

External links
Poet Lore official site

1889 establishments in Maryland
Poetry magazines published in the United States
Biannual magazines published in the United States
Magazines established in 1889
Magazines published in Maryland
Magazines published in Washington, D.C.